Kotryna Teterevkova (born 23 January 2002) is a Lithuanian swimmer. She is the current national record holder in the 200-meter breastroke (long and short course) and 400-meter individual medley (long and short course).

Teterevkova is also a member of Sostinės sporto centras, and is coached and trained by Michailas Romanovskis. She competed in the women's 100 metre breaststroke at the 2019 World Aquatics Championships held in Gwangju, South Korea. She represents LA Current in the International Swimming League.

Career

2020 Summer Olympics

At the 2020 Summer Olympics in Tokyo, Teterevkova competed in two events: 100 metre breaststroke and 200 metre breaststroke. In 100 metre breaststroke heats, Teterevkova placed fifteenth and set a new personal record of 1:06.82 seconds. In the 100 metre breaststroke semi-finals, she placed fourteenth, with a time of 1:07.39 seconds. In 200 metre breaststroke heats, Teterevkova placed 23rd, with a time of 2:26.82 seconds and did not qualify to the semi-finals.

2021 European Short Course Swimming Championships

At the 2021 European Short Course Swimming Championships in Kazan, Russia, Teterevkova competed in three events: 50 metre breaststroke, 100 metre breaststroke and 200 metre breaststroke.

2022 European Aquatics Championships

At the 2022 European Aquatics Championships in Rome, Italy, Teterevkova competed in 200 metre breaststroke final, where she won the bronze medal with a time of 2:24.16.

International championships (50 m)

 Mixed 4 × 100 metre medley relay
 Team Lithuania was disqualified in the heats

References

External links
 

2002 births
Living people
Lithuanian female breaststroke swimmers
Place of birth missing (living people)
Swimmers at the 2018 Summer Youth Olympics
Swimmers at the 2020 Summer Olympics
Olympic swimmers of Lithuania
21st-century Lithuanian women
European Aquatics Championships medalists in swimming